Full Flush Poker was the flagship online poker operator on the Equity Poker Network, beginning operation in September 2013. The network is operated from the online gambling friendly country of Costa Rica and held a license issued by the Curaçao Gaming and Licensing Commission. Full Flush Poker allowed players from the United States.

Full Flush Poker ceased operation in October 2016.

References

Internet properties established in 2013
Internet properties disestablished in 2016
Gambling companies established in 2013
Gambling companies disestablished in 2016
Defunct poker companies